Clepsis subjunctana is a species of moth of the family Tortricidae. It is found on Madeira.

References

Moths described in 1858
Clepsis